Standard Romanian (i.e. the Daco-Romanian language within Balkan Romance) shares largely the same grammar and most of the vocabulary and phonological processes with the other three surviving varieties of Balkan Romance, namely Aromanian, Megleno-Romanian, and Istro-Romanian.

As a Romance language, Romanian shares many characteristics with its more distant relatives: Italian, French, Spanish, Portuguese, Catalan, etc. However, Romanian has preserved certain features of Latin grammar that have been lost elsewhere. This could be explained by a host of arguments such as: relative isolation in the Balkans, possible pre-existence of identical grammatical structures in its substratum (as opposed to the substrata over which the other Romance languages developed), and existence of similar elements in the neighboring languages. One Latin element that has survived in Romanian while having disappeared from other Romance languages is the morphological case differentiation in nouns. Nevertheless, declensions have been reduced to only three forms (nominative/accusative, genitive/dative, and vocative) from the original six or seven. Another might be the retention of the neuter gender in nouns, although in synchronic terms, Romanian neuter nouns can also be analysed as "ambigeneric", that is as being masculine in the singular and feminine in the plural (see below) and even in diachronic terms certain linguists have argued that this pattern, as well as that of case differentiation, was in a sense "re-invented" rather than a "direct" continuation of the Latin neuter.

Romanian is attested from the 16th century. The first Romanian grammar was Elementa linguae daco-romanae sive valachicae by 
Samuil Micu and Gheorghe Șincai, published in 1780. Many modern writings on Romanian grammar, in particular, most of those published by the Romanian Academy, are prescriptive; the rules regarding plural formation, verb conjugation, word spelling and meanings, etc. are revised periodically to include new tendencies in the language.

Nouns

Gender
Romanian nouns are categorized into three genders: masculine, feminine, and neuter. The neuter behaves like the masculine in the singular and the feminine in the plural, unlike the neuter in Latin which had distinct forms. Nouns which in their dictionary form (singular, nominative, with no article) end in a consonant or the vowel/semivowel -u are mostly masculine or neuter; if they end in -ă or -a they are usually feminine. In the plural, the ending -i corresponds generally to masculine nouns, whereas feminine and neuter nouns often end in -e. As there are many exceptions to these rules, each noun must be learned together with its gender.

Examples:
 Masculine:  ('man, human being'),  ('ox'),  ('tree');
 Neuter:  ('road'),  ('present, gift'),  ('example');
 Feminine:  ('grandmother'),  ('book'),  ('coffee').

For nouns designating people the grammatical gender can only be masculine or feminine, and is strictly determined by the biological sex, no matter the phonetics of the noun.

For native speakers, the general rule for determining a noun's gender relies on the "one-two" test, which consists in inflecting the noun to both the singular and the plural, together with the numbers one and two. Depending on the gender, the numbers will have different forms for each of the three genders: masculine nouns will be ; feminine nouns, ; neuter nouns, .

 Masculine: ,  ('one human being', 'two human beings'),  ('one rabbit', 'two rabbits').
 Feminine: ,  ('one girl', 'two girls'),  ('one bird', 'two birds').
 Neuter: ,  ('one body', 'two bodies'),  ('one drawer', 'two drawers'). In this case  is in its masculine form while  is in its feminine form. This is the only case in which the two numbers have different genders.

Romanian numbers generally have a single form regardless of the gender of the determined noun. Exceptions are the numbers  ('one')  ('two') and all the numbers made up of two or more digits when the last digit is 1 or 2; these have masculine and feminine forms. In Romanian there is no gender-neutral form for numbers, adjectives or other noun determiners.

Number
Romanian has two grammatical numbers: singular and plural. Morphologically, the plural form is built by adding specific endings to the singular form. For example, nominative nouns without the definite article form the plural by adding one of the endings -i, -uri, -e, or -le. The plural formation mechanism, often involving other changes in the word structure, is an intrinsic property of each noun and has to be learned together with it.

Examples:
 -i:  –  ('tree'),  –  ('horse'),  –  ('father'),  –  ('boat');
 -uri:  –  ('train'),  –  ('job, task'),  –  ('tent');
 -e:  –  ('straw'),  –  ('table, meal'),  –  ('theater'),  –  ('museum');
 -le:  –  ('star'),  –  ('coffee'),  –  ('pajama').

Case
Romanian has inherited three cases from Latin: nominative/accusative, dative/genitive and vocative. Morphologically, the nominative and the accusative are identical in nouns; similarly, the genitive and the dative share the same form (these pairs are distinct in the personal pronouns, however). The vocative is less used as it is normally restricted to nouns designating people or things which are commonly addressed directly. Additionally, nouns in the vocative often borrow the nominative form even when there is a distinct vocative form available.

The genitive-dative form can be derived from the nominative. For feminine nouns the form used in the dative/genitive singular is most often identical to the nominative plural, for example  –  –  (a book – of/to a book – two books).

If the noun is determined by a determiner other than the definite article (an indefinite article, a demonstrative, an indefinite quantifier), then the genitive-dative affixes are applied to this determiner, not to the noun, for example  –  ('a boy' – 'of/to a boy'). Similarly, if the noun is determined by the definite article (an enclitic in Romanian, see that section), the genitive-dative mark is added at the end of the noun together with the article, for example  –  ('the boy' – 'of/to the boy'),  –  ('the book' – 'of/to the book'). Masculine proper names designating people form the genitive-dative by placing the article  before the noun:  ('of/to Brâncuși'); the same applies to feminine names only when they don't have a typically feminine ending: .

Romanian dative phrases exhibit clitic doubling similar to that in Spanish, in which the noun in the dative is doubled by a pronoun. The position of this pronoun in the sentence depends on the mood and tense of the verb. For example, in the sentence  ('I give a present to [my] parents'), the pronoun  doubles the noun  without bringing any additional information.

As specified above, the vocative case in Romanian has a special form for most nouns. The tendency in contemporary Romanian is to use the nominative forms, however. The traditional vocative is retained in speech, however, especially in informal speech, or by people living in the countryside. It is seen as a mark of unrefined speech by the majority of city-dwellers, who refrain from its usage. The forms of the vocative are as follows. (Note that the vocative does not have both definite and indefinite forms. The following rules are to be applied for the indefinite form of the nouns):

 Singular feminine nouns and proper names ending in an unstressed -ă/-a take the ending -o e.g.  →  ('girl!'). Some popular plurals are different, though:  → ! ('Mary!').
 Singular feminine nouns ending in an unstressed -e take the ending -eo e.g.  → ! ('bridge!'). Sometimes, the e is dropped altogether.
 Singular feminine nouns ending in a stressed -a take the ending -auo e.g.  → ! ('stick!').
 Singular masculine and neuter nouns ending in a consonant take the ending -ule e.g.  → ! ('boy!'). The vocative for animate nouns is sometimes formed as if the noun were a proper name:  → ! (see below).
 Singular masculine and neuter nouns ending in unstressed -e/-ă take no extra ending (-Ø) e.g.  → ! ('brother!').
 Masculine proper names take the ending -e e.g.  → ! ('Stephen!'). Some words also experience some change in their vowels ( → ! 'John!').
 All plural nouns take the ending -lor e.g.  → ! ('apples!').

Here are some examples of nouns completely inflected.

Articles

Definite article
An often cited peculiarity of Romanian, which it shares with Aromanian, Megleno-Romanian, and Istro-Romanian, is that, unlike all other Romance languages, the definite articles are attached to the end of the noun as enclitics (as in Bulgarian, Macedonian, Albanian, and North Germanic languages) instead of being placed in front. These enclitic definite articles are believed to have been formed, as in other Romance languages, from Latin demonstrative pronouns. The table below shows the generally accepted etymology of the Romanian definite article.

Examples:

 Masculine nouns (singular, nominative/accusative):
 –  ('forest' – 'the forest');
 –  ('tree' – 'the tree');
 –  ('brother' – 'the brother');
 –  ('father' – 'the father').

 Neuter nouns (singular, nominative/accusative):
 –  ('theater' – 'the theater');
 –  ('place' – 'the place');

 Feminine nouns (singular, nominative/accusative):
casă – casa (house – the house);
floare – floarea (flower – the flower);
cutie – cutia (box – the box);
stea – steaua (star – the star);

Indefinite article
The Romanian indefinite article, unlike the definite article, is placed before the noun, and has likewise derived from Latin:

(The Latin phrase nescio quid means "I don't know what".)

Nouns in the vocative case cannot be determined by an indefinite article.

Examples of indefinite article usage:

Masculine:
nominative/accusative: singular un copil (a child) – plural niște copii ([some] children);
genitive/dative: singular unui copil (of/to a child) – plural unor copii (of/to [some] children);
Neuter:
nominative/accusative: singular un loc (a place) – plural niște locuri ([some] places);
genitive/dative: singular unui loc (of/to a place) – plural unor locuri (of/to [some] places);
Feminine:
nominative/accusative: singular o masă (a table) – plural niște mese ([some] tables);
genitive/dative: singular unei mese (of/to a table) – plural unor mese (of/to [some] tables);

Article appended to adjectives
When a noun is determined by an adjective, the normal word order is noun + adjective, and the article (definite or indefinite) is appended to the noun. However, the word order adjective + noun is also possible, mostly used for emphasis on the adjective. Then, the article and the case marker, if any, are applied to the adjective instead:

 Noun + adjective (normal order):
un student bun (a good student);
studentul bun (the good student);
unui student bun (to a good student);
studentului bun (to the good student).

 Adjective + noun (reversed order):
un bun student (a good student);
bunul student (the good student);
unui bun student (to a good student);
bunului student (to the good student).

Demonstrative article
The demonstrative article is used to put emphasis on the relative superlative of adjectives. The forms are cel and celui (m. sg.), cea and celei (f. sg.), cei and celor (m. pl.) and cele and celor (f. pl.).

Genitival article
There are situations in Romanian when the noun in the genitive requires the presence of the so-called genitival (or possessive) article (see for example the section "Genitive" in "Romanian nouns"), somewhat similar to the English preposition of, for example in a map of China. In Romanian this becomes o hartă a Chinei, where "a" is the genitival article. The table below shows how the genitival articles depend on gender and number.

The genitival article also has genitive/dative forms, which are used only with a possessive pronoun. They are: alui (m. sg.), alei (f. sg.), and alor (pl., both genders). These forms are rarely used—especially the singular ones—and the sentences are usually rephrased to avoid them.

Adjectives
Romanian adjectives determine the quality of things. They can only fulfill the syntactical functions of attribute and of adjectival complement, which in Romanian is called nume predicativ (nominal predicative).

Adjective inflection
Adjectives in Romanian inflect for number and gender (and for case in the feminine singular genitive/dative). There are adjectives that have distinct forms for all combinations, some that don't distinguish between gender only in the plural, others that don't distinguish gender, and a few that don't distinguish either gender or number.

The adjective frumos ("beautiful") four distinct inflected forms:

The adjective lung ("long") has three forms:

The adjective verde ("green") has two inflected forms:

The foreign borrowed adjective oranj ("orange") is called invariable, having just one inflected form. 

Adjectives that have more than one inflected form are called variable.

Adjective syntax
Syntactical functions of the adjective can be:

 Attribute, in case it defines a noun, pronoun or numeral. (e.g.: The blond boy is here. Băiatul blond este aici.)
 Adjectival complement, in case it defines a copulative verb. (e.g.: The boy is blond. Băiatul este blond.)

Degrees of comparison

An adjective also can have degrees of comparison.

 Positive Degree (frumos, beautiful)
 Comparative Degree:
 Of equality (la fel de frumos, as beautiful as)
 Of inequality (note that the following degrees are written as "comparative of superiority/inferiority", not as "comparative of inequality of superiority/inferiority") 
 Of superiority (mai frumos, more beautiful) 
 Of inferiority (mai puțin frumos, less beautiful)
 Superlative Degree:
 Relative Superlative
 Of superiority (cel mai frumos, the most beautiful)
 Of inferiority (cel mai puțin frumos, the least beautiful)
 Absolute Superlative (foarte frumos, very beautiful)
 Of superiority (foarte frumos, translated as "very beautiful")
 Of inferiority (foarte puțin frumos, roughly translated as "very little beautiful"). This form is not used very much, though, as antonyms can be used (foarte puțin frumos becomes foarte urât, "very little beautiful" becomes "very ugly")

Pronouns

Personal pronouns

Personal pronouns come in four different cases, depending on their usage in the phrase.

Nominative case

There are eight personal pronouns (pronume personale) in Romanian:

The pronouns above are those in the nominative case. They are usually omitted in Romanian unless it is necessary to disambiguate the meaning of a sentence. Usually, the verb ending provides information about the subject. The feminine forms of plural pronouns are used only for groups of persons or items of exclusively female gender. If the group contains elements of both genders, the masculine form is used. Pronouns in the vocative case in Romanian, which is used for exclamations, or summoning, also take the forms of the nominative case.

Accusative case
The accusative forms of the pronouns come in two forms: a stressed and an unstressed form:

The stressed form of the pronoun is used (in phrases that are not inverted) after the verb while the unstressed form is employed before the verb. Romanian requires both forms of a pronoun to be present in a sentence if a relative clause is employed, which also reverses the order of the forms (stressed before unstressed). Otherwise, the stressed form is usually left out, the only exception being its usage for adding emphasis to the pronoun.

 Îl văd – I see him/it (a statement of fact)
 Îl văd pe el – I see him (It is him that I see, and no other)
 Fata pe care o văd – The girl whom I see

Dative case
The dative forms of the pronouns:

Genitive case
The genitive forms of the pronouns (also called possessive pronouns, pronume posesive):

The retention of the genitive, in the third person, is to be noted; the pronoun, like Latin eius, eorum, inflects according to the possessor, not according to the possessed.

Reflexive pronouns
These are the forms of the reflexive pronouns (pronume reflexive):

The above reflexive pronouns are in the accusative and dative cases, and in both stressed / unstressed forms. As is made clear, the reflexive pronouns are identical to the personal pronouns, with the exception of the 3rd person, which has entirely new forms. The genitival forms of the reflexive pronouns are the same for the 1st and 2nd persons, but also differ in the 3rd person singular, which is al său. This is a direct continuation of Latin usage; Latin suus was used only when the possessor was the subject of the sentence.

Polite pronouns
The polite pronouns (pronumele de politețe) are a way of addressing someone formally. They are normally used for interaction with strangers, or by children talking to adults whom they don't know well, or to teachers as a sign of respect. When used in the plural, the second person pronoun is a polite one, for use in formal occasions, or among unacquainted adults, whereas its singular forms are less polite, their use having become pejorative in modern use (see below).

It should also be noted that mata, mătăluță and similar pronouns were considered polite pronouns in the past, but nowadays only rural communities use them (for example, between neighbours).

The polite pronouns all have the same forms in all cases (the only exception being , with the genitive/dative form of dumitale), and they exist only in the second and third person, due to their not being used to refer to oneself:

{| class="wikitable" style="text-align: center;"
! colspan="2" | 
! Singular
! Plural
|-
! colspan="2" style="text-align: left;" | Second person
| | 
|-
! rowspan="2" style="text-align: left;" | Third person
! style="text-align: left;" | Masc.
| 
| rowspan="2" | 
|-
! style="text-align: left;" | Fem.
| 
|}

However, it is considered by some to be of the same degree of politeness as tu.

Demonstrative pronouns
There are many demonstrative pronouns (pronume demonstrative) in Romanian. They are classified as pronume de apropiere, pronume de depărtare, pronume de diferențiere, pronume de identitate, which mean, respectively, pronouns of proximity, pronouns of remoteness, pronouns of differentiation, and pronouns of identity.

Pronouns of proximity and remoteness
These pronouns describe objects which are either close to the speaker, or farther away from the speaker (formal register/informal register):

Pronouns of differentiation and identity
These pronouns describe objects either different from an aforementioned object or the same:

Intensive pronouns
The intensive pronouns and adjectives are used for emphasis.

Relative and interrogative pronounsPronumele relative și interogative, the two types of pronouns are identical in form but differ in usage. The relative pronouns are used to connect relative clauses to their main clause, but interrogative pronouns are used to form questions. The interrogative pronouns are usually written out with a question mark after them to differentiate them from their relative counterparts.

These are the most common relative/interrogative pronouns:

Negative and indefinite pronounsPronumele negative și nehotărâte, these two types of pronouns are used to express negation, as well as indefinite concepts. There are many indefinite pronouns, but only a limited number of negative pronouns.

The most common indefinite pronouns are:

The most common negative pronouns are:

Numbers

In Romanian grammar, unlike English, the words representing numbers are considered to form a distinct part of speech, called numeral (plural: numerale). Examples:

 Cardinal
 Proper: doi (two);
 Multiplicative: îndoit (double);
 Collective: amândoi (both);
 Distributive: câte doi (in twos);
 Fractional: doime (half) (pronounced );
 Adverbial: de două ori (twice);
 Ordinal: al doilea (the second).

Verbs

As in all Romance languages, Romanian verbs are inflected according to person, number, tense, mood, and voice. The usual word order in sentences is SVO (Subject – Verb – Object). Romanian verbs are traditionally categorized into four large conjugation groups depending on the ending in the infinitive mood. The actual conjugation patterns for each group are multiple.

First conjugation: verbs ending in –a (long infinitive in –are), such as a da, dare "to give", a cânta, cântare "to sing", including those ending in hiatus ea, such as a crea, creare "to create".
Second conjugation: verbs ending in –ea (long infinitive in stressed -ere), only when ea is a diphthong, such as a putea, putere "can", a cădea, cădere "to fall".
Third conjugation: verbs ending in –e (long infinitive in unstressed –ere), such as a vinde, vindere "to sell", a crede, credere "to believe".
Fourth conjugation: verbs ending in –i or –î (long infinitive in –ire or –âre), such as a veni, venire "to come", a urî, urâre "to hate".

Adverbs
In Romanian, adverbs usually determine verbs (but could also modify a clause or an entire sentence) by adding a qualitative description to the action. Romanian adverbs are invariant and are identical in shape (being both homophones and homographs) to the corresponding adjective in its masculine singular form. A remarkable counterexample for this is the adjective-adverb pair bun-bine ("good" (masculine singular) – "well").

Some examples are

 Băieții sunt jucători buni. – The boys are good players. (adjective)
 Băieții joacă bine. – The boys play well. (adverb)
 Cântecul acesta este frumos. – This song is beautiful. (adjective)
 Cântăreața cântă frumos. – The singer sings beautifully. (adverb)

Prepositions
The preposition before a noun determines which case the noun must take.

No prepositions take nouns in the nominative case.

Prepositions with accusative
 pe is used to introduce a direct object when it is represented by a proper name, in which case it does not have a lexical meaning. Pe is also used with the accusative to introduce a circumstantial object of location (English on).
 cu (with) introduces the instrument of the action. It is used to indicate (among others) one's conversation partner, an association with an object, or a means of transport.
 la (at) indicates the location or time of the action or its direction. More specific forms are în (in), spre (towards), pe la (around)
 pentru (for) indicates the scope of an action, or the beneficiary thereof.

Prepositions with dative
The only prepositions that demand the Dative Case, are: grație (thanks to), datorită (through, with), mulțumită (thanks to), conform (as per), contrar (against), potrivit (according to), aidoma — archaic — (like, similar to), asemenea (such).

Prepositions with genitive
Other prepositions require the genitive case of nouns. Note that some prepositions of this sort have evolved from phrases with feminine nouns and, as a consequence, require a feminine possessive form when the object is a pronoun; e.g., împotriva mea (against me).

Interjections
In Romanian there are many interjections, and they are commonly used. Those that denote sounds made by animals or objects are called onomatopee, a form similar to the English language onomatopoeia. Below, some interjections and their approximative equivalent in English are shown.

Common interjections
 Vai! – Oh, my! / Oh, dear!
 Ah! – same as in English Oau! – Wow!
 Of! – equivalent to a sigh
 Hmmm... – said when thinking
 Mamă-mamă – said when expressing something cool or extraordinary
 Iată – somewhat like behold!Onomatopoeia
 lip-lip – the sound made when slurping liquids (usually by dogs)
 țuști – a sound designating a quick move
 mor-mor – the sound a bear makes
 cucurigu – the sound a rooster makes, cock-a-doodle-doo! ham-ham – the sound a dog makes, bark! miau – the sound a cat makes, meow! cip-cirip – the sound birds make, chirp! mu – the sound a cow makes, moo!Use within sentences
Within a sentence, interjections can function as attributes, verbal equivalents, or they can be used as filler, which has no syntactical function at all.

 Attribute: Mi-am luat o fustă mamă-mamă. I bought a cool skirt. Verbal Equivalent: Iată-l pe Ion. Look, there is Ion Filler: Hmmm... Mă gândesc ce să fac. Hmmm... I am thinking about what to do.Phrase syntax
Romanian has terminology and rules for phrase syntax, which describes the way simple sentences relate to one another within a single complex sentence. There are many functions a simple sentence may take, their number usually being determined by the number of predicates. It is also noteworthy that Romanian terminology for the terms simple sentence, complex sentence, and phrase is somewhat counterintuitive. The Romanian term propoziție means as much as simple sentence (or clause). To describe a complex sentence (or compound sentence), Romanian uses the word frază, which can cause confusion with the English word phrase, which describes not a complex sentence, but a grouping of words. In consequence, Romanian doesn't have terms for the English noun phrase, or verb phrase, preferring the more commonly understood term predicate for the latter. The former has no formal equivalent in Romanian.

Simple sentences can be of two types: main clauses and subordinate clauses

Main clause
The main clause, within a complex sentence, does not rely on another sentence to be fully understood. In other words, it has stand-alone meaning. The following example has the verb phrase underlined.

Example:Am văzut copiii din curtea școlii.I have seen the children in the school courtyard.

Even though this sentence is long, it is still composed of a single simple sentence, which is a main clause.

Subordinate clause
A subordinate clause cannot have a stand-alone meaning. It relies on a main clause to give it meaning. It usually determines or defines an element of another clause, be it a main clause, or a subordinate one. The following example has the verb phrase underlined, and the element of relation, which is to say, the relative pronoun used to link the two sentences, in bold. The sentences are also separated and numbered.

Example:Am văzut copiii 1/ care sunt în curtea școlii. 2/I have seen the children 1/ who are in the school courtyard. 2/

There are also subordinate clauses other than the relative clause, which is an attributive clause, since it determines a noun, pronoun or numeral, and not a verb phrase. Here is a list of examples illustrating some of the remaining cases:

Direct Object Clause (propoziție subordonată completivă directă):Înțeleg 1/ ce zice profesoara. 2/I understand 1/ what the teacher is saying. 2/

Indirect Object Clause (propoziție subordonată completivă indirectă):Mă gândesc 1/ la ce spune profesoara. 2/I am thinking  1/ about what the teacher is saying. 2/

Subject Clause (propoziție subordonată subiectivă):Ceea ce zice profesoara, 1/ e corect. 2/What the teacher is saying, 1/ is true. 2/

Local Circumstantial Object Clause (propoziție subordonată completivă circumstanțială de loc):Mă văd cu Ionuț 1/ unde (mi-)a propus el. 2/I am meeting Johnny 1/ where he proposed (to me). 2/

Clauses introduced by coordinating conjunctions
Some conjunctions are called coordinating because they do not define the type of clause introduced. Rather, they coordinate an existing clause with another, making the new clause of the same type as the other one. The coordinating conjunctions are of four types (note that the list is not exhaustive):

 The copulative conjunctions are: și (and), nici (neither), and precum și (as well as).
 The adversative conjunctions are: dar/însă/ci (but) and iar (on the other hand).
 The disjunctive conjunctions are: sau/ori/fie (or/either).
 The conclusive conjunctions are: deci/așadar (thus), în concluzie (in conclusion), and prin urmare (therefore).

An example of two main clauses (1, 2) linked together by a coordinative conjunction (bold) is:Ana este o fată 1/ și Ion este un băiat. 2/Ana is a girl, 1/ and Ion is a boy. 2/

Two subordinate clauses (2, 3) can also be joined to the same end:V-am spus despre băiatul 1/ care este la mine în clasă, 2/ și care este foarte bun la matematică. 3/I have told you about the boy 1/ who is in my class, 2/ and who is very good in mathematics. 3/

The same effect of two main clauses (1, 2) being tied together can also be achieved via juxtaposition of the sentences using a comma:Am păzit palatul, 1/ palatul era și foarte greu de păzit. 2/I guarded the palace, 1/ the palace was very hard to guard, too. 2/

References

Bibliography
 Gabriela Pană Dindelegan, ed. The Grammar of Romanian. Oxford: Oxford University Press, 2013.
 Carmen Dobrovie-Sorin & Ion Giurgea, eds. A Reference Grammar of Romanian, vol. 1: The Noun Phrase''. John Benjamins, 2013.

External links
 Very detailed Romanian grammar (PDF; 183 pages; 4.6 MB)
 Romanian Grammar Workbook (1996) for Peace Corps Volunteers, Peace Corps (Moldova)
 Verbix: Romanian verbs conjugation (Attention: Generally good output, but a few verbs are not conjugated correctly.)
 Romanian <-> English online dictionary and Romanian verb conjugator (few mistakes)
 Romanian online dictionary and lemmatizer